Jack "Jocko" Gotta (November 14, 1929 – June 29, 2013) was an American-born Canadian professional football player, coach, and general manager.

Gotta played Tight End at Oregon State in 1952 and Hamilton Air Force Base from 1954-1956.  He signed with the Cleveland Browns in 1956, but was cut and played with the Calgary Stampeders of the Canadian Football League from 1957-1959.  In 1960 he signed with the Saskatchewan Roughriders.  He sometimes played corner linebacker and safety due to injuries on defense. During the 1964 season he was cut by Saskatchewan and signed by the Montreal Alouettes.

In 1965 he rejoined the Roughriders as an assistant coach.  He resigned after the 1967 season and joined the Ottawa Rough Riders coaching staff.  In 1970 he replaced the retiring Frank Clair as head coach.  The team went from first to last place, however the team made the playoffs every year afterwards.  He had a 30-26 record in his four seasons as Ottawa's head coach, winning the Grey Cup in 1973 and the Annis Stukus Trophy in 1972 and 1973.

In 1974, he jumped to the World Football League's Birmingham Americans as head coach and general manager.  The Americans, led by George Mira, Charley Harraway, and Dennis Homan, finished with a 15-5 record and won the only WFL World Bowl at Birmingham's Legion Field, defeating the Florida Blazers 22-21.

In 1975 the Americans folded, new ownership was brought in and the team renamed themselves the Vulcans. Gotta stayed on as General Manager only. The team had a league best 9-3 record when the WFL folded.  He returned to the CFL in 1977 as head coach/general manager of the Calgary Stampeders.  He retired as coach after four seasons, but remained on as GM.

When Jerry Williams resigned as head coach after the 1981 CFL season, he returned to the sidelines. He remained in Calgary until 1983, when he was fired after missing the playoffs.

As the Stampeders coach, he finished with a 44-46-6 record and won Coach of the Year in 1978.

In 1984 he joined the CFL on CTV as a commentator. He left the network to become head coach of the Saskatchewan Roughriders in 1985. In 2 seasons with the Green Riders he had an 11-22-1 record,

Gotta died on June 29, 2013 in Calgary.

References

1929 births
2013 deaths
American emigrants to Canada
American football executives
American football linebackers
American football safeties
American football tight ends
Birmingham Americans coaches
Calgary Stampeders coaches
Calgary Stampeders players
Canadian Football League announcers
Cleveland Browns players
Montreal Alouettes players
Oregon State Beavers football players
People from Ironwood, Michigan
Players of American football from Michigan
Saskatchewan Roughriders players